is a subway station in Minato, Tokyo, Japan, operated jointly by Tokyo Metro and Toei Subway.

Lines 
Tokyo Metro Hibiya Line (H-04)
Toei Oedo Line (E-23)

Station layout
The Toei Oedo Line platform 1 is 42 meters underground, making this station the deepest of the Tokyo subway stations. (The Toei Oedo Line platform 2 is 32 meters underground.)

Tokyo Metro
Two side platforms serving two tracks.

Toei
Two side platforms serving two tracks. Platform 1 is located on the 7th basement level, and platform 2 is located on the 5th basement level.

History 
The Hibiya Line station opened on March 25, 1964. The Oedo Line station opened on December 12, 2000.

The station facilities of the Hibiya Line were inherited by Tokyo Metro after the privatization of the Teito Rapid Transit Authority (TRTA) in 2004.

Surrounding area
 Roppongi
 Roppongi Hills (TV Asahi, etc.)
 Tokyo Midtown
 The National Art Center, Tokyo
 the National Graduate Institute for Policy Studies
 Akasaka Press Center
 Stars and Stripes

See also
 List of railway stations in Japan

References

External links

 Roppongi Station (Tokyo Metro) 
 Roppongi Station (Tokyo Metro) 
 Roppongi Station (Toei) 
 Roppongi Station (Toei) 

Tokyo Metro Hibiya Line
Toei Ōedo Line
Stations of Tokyo Metropolitan Bureau of Transportation
Railway stations in Tokyo
Roppongi
Railway stations in Japan opened in 1964
Buildings and structures in Minato, Tokyo